Mga Basang Sisiw (International title: Lost Children / ) is a 2013 Philippine television drama series broadcast by GMA Network. The series is based on a 1981 Philippine film of the same title. Directed by Ricky Davao, it stars Renz Valerio, Bianca Umali, Kimberly Faye, Hershey Garcia and Miko Zarsadias. It premiered on June 3, 2013, on the network's Afternoon Prime line up replacing Unforgettable. The series concluded on November 1, 2013, with a total of 110 episodes. It was replaced by Villa Quintana in its timeslot.

Premise
The series chronicles the story of five siblings – Justin, Faye, Shine, Cha and Mickey – and their long and painful journey to rebuild their once happy family.

Cast and characters

Lead cast
 Renz Valerio as Justin Santos
 Bianca Umali as Feline "Faye" Santos
 Kimberly Faye Fulgar as Sunshine "Shine" Santos
 Hershey Garcia as Charity "Cha" Santos
 Miko Zarsadias as Michael "Mickey" Santos

Supporting cast
 Raymond Bagatsing as Froilan Santos
 Lani Mercado as Olivia Santos
 Maxene Magalona as Victoria "Vicky" Santa Maria
 Gardo Versoza as Efren Rodrigo
 Mike Tan as Gregorio "Rigor" Manalastas
 Caridad Sanchez as Lagring
 Maricris Garcia as Cecilia "Cecile" Reyes

Guest cast
 Jaya as Sally
 Joko Diaz as Tony

Background
The television series is a re-imagining of Agustin dela Cruz's blockbuster classic flick Mga Basang Sisiw (a Pinoy idiomatic expression which means pitiful/hopeless/in dire condition). Produced and released by BSH Films in 1981, the movie stars Julie Vega, Janice de Belen, Cheche Perez de Tagle, Sheryl Cruz, Niño Muhlach and Helen Vela, who also served as producer.

Production and development
April 2013, GMA Network announced that they would adapt Mga Basang Sisiw into a soap opera, posing the theme: "No matter how bad life seems, someone always shares and understands one's confinement in such a desperate state." Head writer Richard Cruz enhanced the original plot by adding twists, subplots and additional characters. The series was executive produced by Kaye Atienza-Cadsawan and directed by Ricky Davao. The creative team was composed of Afternoon Prime Head, Roy Iglesias; Creative Consultant, Kit Villanueva Langit; Program Manager, Hazel F. Abonita; Headwriter, Richard Dode Cruz; writers,  Luningning Ribay and Christine Novicio; and Brainstormers, Gilda Olvidado and Liberty Trinidad.

The series features eleven regular speaking roles. The majority of the ensemble cast was assembled in March/April 2013. Lani Mercado and Raymond Bagatsing were the first two actors to be chosen. The role of Vicky Santa Maria was originally offered to LJ Reyes who declined, so it was given to Maxene Magalona – her first "anti-hero" role. Magalona described her role as "super villain" and further stated "later in the series, it will be shown why my character is behaving that way, cold and cruel. [...] people will also sympathize with my character when they understand why she's acting that way." Gardo Versoza, veteran actress Caridad Sanchez and Mike Tan were the last actors to be cast. Tan described his role Rigor Manalastas as a "grey" character and "you either love him or hate him."

Ratings
According to AGB Nielsen Philippines' Mega Manila household television ratings, the pilot episode of Mga Basang Sisiw earned a 13.5% rating. While the final episode scored a 15.3% rating.

Accolades

References

External links
 

2013 Philippine television series debuts
2013 Philippine television series endings
Filipino-language television shows
GMA Network drama series
Live action television shows based on films
Television shows set in Quezon City